Marcello Thedford is an American film actor, television actor and power lifter known for his roles as Kelvin "Buffalo" James on the ESPN dramatic series Playmakers, Semi in Employee of the Month, and in eight episodes of ER as Leon, Dr. Greg Pratt's mentally challenged brother.

Career
Thedford's acting career began in improvisational theater in New York City. He studied there at the Third World Theater at Black Drama Productions. His first significant role came in the film Dangerous Minds. He also appeared in the television version of the film. He has also appeared in NYPD Blue, The District, Veronica Mars and Monk among others. He also played Peanut in the hit show Girlfriends. He starred in Why Do Fools Fall In Love.

In 2009, Thedford made a guest appearance on The CW's The Game.

Personal life 
Thedford is a certified power lifter, holding a California state record. He grew up in The Bronx, New York, and resides in Los Angeles.

Filmography

Film

Television

References

External links

 ESPN profile

Year of birth missing (living people)
Living people
African-American male actors
American male film actors
American male television actors
21st-century African-American people